Nathaniel Herrick Griffin, D.D. (28 December 1814 – 16 October 1876) was an American Presbyterian minister.
Griffin was born at Southampton, L.I., December 28, 1814. He graduated from Williams College, Mass., in 1834; spent two years in Princeton Theological Seminary; was a tutor in his alma mater in 1836-37; became thereafter stated supply successively at Westhampton, N.Y., and at Franklin; was ordained by the Presbytery June 27, 1839; was pastor at Delhi; acted as assistant professor in Williams College (1841–42), and: as a teacher in Brooklyn (1843–46), professor of Latin and Greek in Williams College (1846–53), of Greek (185357), a teacher in Williamstown, Mass. (1857–68), librarian there (1868-76), and died in that place, October 16, 1876. See Genesis Cat. of Princeton Theol. Sem. 1881, page 99.

References

External links 
 

1814 births
1876 deaths
British emigrants to the United States
American Presbyterian ministers
Williams College faculty
Williams College alumni
Princeton Theological Seminary alumni
American librarians
American political activists
19th-century American clergy